Olenecamptus senegalensis is a species of beetle in the family Cerambycidae. It was described by Stephan von Breuning in 1936. It is known from Senegal, the Democratic Republic of the Congo, the Central African Republic, and Uganda.

References

Dorcaschematini
Beetles described in 1936